The women's javelin throw event at the 2011 Summer Universiade was held on 18 August.

Results

References
Results

Javelin
2011 in women's athletics
2011